Istočni Stari Grad (lit. "East Old Town") is a municipality of the city of Istočno Sarajevo located in Republika Srpska, an entity of Bosnia and Herzegovina. As of 2013, it has a population of 1,131 inhabitants.

It was also known as Srpski Stari Grad (Српски Стари Град, "Serbian Old Town") and was created from part of the pre-war municipality of Stari Grad (the other part of the pre-war municipality is now in the Federation of Bosnia and Herzegovina). The seat of municipality is Hreša.

Demographics

Population

Ethnic composition

Gallery

References

External links 

 Official website

Populated places in Istočni Stari Grad
Municipalities of Republika Srpska
Istočno Sarajevo